Westknollendam is a village in the northwest Netherlands. It is located in the municipality of Zaanstad, North Holland, about 15 km northwest of Amsterdam. The village is located along the Zaan river. On the opposite shore is Oostknollendam, in the municipality of Wormerland.

References

External links

Populated places in North Holland
Zaanstad